Ian Sneddon (born 30 November 1946) is a Scottish former professional footballer, who played for Heart of Midlothian, Denver Dynamos and Morton. 

In 1977, he played in Canada in the National Soccer League with Windsor Stars.

References

1946 births
Living people
Association football fullbacks
Scottish footballers
Heart of Midlothian F.C. players
Greenock Morton F.C. players
Scottish Football League players
Denver Dynamos players
North American Soccer League (1968–1984) players
Canadian National Soccer League players
Scottish expatriate footballers
Expatriate soccer players in the United States
Scottish expatriate sportspeople in the United States
Footballers from West Dunbartonshire